Fabian Maria Lago Vilela de Abreu (born 24 October 1997), commonly known as Fabian, is a Brazilian footballer who plays as a defender for Gnistan.

Career statistics

Club

Notes

References

1997 births
Living people
Brazilian footballers
Brazilian expatriate footballers
Association football defenders
Avaí FC players
Rio Branco Atlético Clube players
FC Dordrecht players
Eerste Divisie players
Expatriate footballers in the Netherlands
Brazilian expatriate sportspeople in the Netherlands
Brazilian expatriate sportspeople in Finland
Expatriate footballers in Finland
IF Gnistan players
Footballers from Rio de Janeiro (city)